Techno-Bush is a 1984 studio album by South African jazz trumpeter Hugh Masekela. It was recorded in Gaborone, Botswana.

Reception
Robert Christgau stated: "Like Malcolm McLaren with a birthright, Masekela has given up the dull demijazz of his U.S. period and returned to Africa, where he cops riffs and rhythms, calypso raps and organ jive and of course trumpet parts, as cannily as the cleverest imperialist, then serves them up in a highly palatable English-language fusion. Beyond a few leftover dull spots my only cavil is the lyric of the demihit, 'Don't Go Lose It Baby'—shouldn't crow so about being a 'winner' in a country where the deck is stacked like it is in Botswana."

Track listing

Personnel
Band
Hugh Masekela – horns, percussion, vocals, keyboards 
Zakes Mchunu – bass
Bongani Nxele – drums
Banjo Mosele – guitar (rhythm) 
John Selolwane – guitars, vocals (listed as John 'Blackie' Selolwane)
Moses Ngwenya – organ
Gasper Lawal – percussion
Mandisa Dlanga – vocals
Mopati Tsienyane – vocals
Stella Khumalo  – vocals
Tsepo Tshola – vocals

Production
Greg Cutler – engineer
Nigel Green – engineer (mix)
Stewart Levine – producer 
Peter Harris – programming (on the Fairlight CMI music computer)

References

External links

1984 albums
Hugh Masekela albums
Albums produced by Stewart Levine